The Battle of Chotusitz, or Chotusice, sometimes called the Battle of Čáslav, took place on 17 May 1742, in Bohemia, now the Czech Republic; it was part of the 1740 to 1742 First Silesian War, itself a subsidiary of the wider War of the Austrian Succession.

Led by Charles of Lorraine, an Imperial force of around 25,000 men was advancing against French-occupied Prague, when it ran into a Prussian army of roughly equal size, commanded by Frederick the Great. Casualties were heavy on both sides, and the battle had little impact on the war in general, but is considered a Prussian victory as they retained possession of the battlefield.

The First Silesian War ended with the Treaty of Breslau in June 1742, allowing Austria to recapture Prague in December. Hostilities resumed in 1744 with the outbreak of the Second Silesian War.

Background 

The War of the Austrian Succession was sparked by the death of Charles VI in 1740 and the succession of his daughter Maria Theresa. Salic law previously excluded women from inheriting the Habsburg monarchy; the 1713 Pragmatic Sanction set this aside, allowing Maria Theresa to succeed her father.

Austria's position as the most powerful element in the Holy Roman Empire was threatened by the growth of Bavaria, Prussia and Saxony, who disputed the validity of the Sanction. With French support, they invaded the Crown of Bohemia, then the most important industrial area in Europe, comprising Silesia, Moravia and Bohemia. Frederick II occupied Silesia; the richest individual province in the Empire, responsible for 10% of total Imperial income, this was a serious blow to Austria.

Victory at Mollwitz in April 1741 consolidated Frederick's hold on Silesia, while a French-Bavarian force captured Prague in November. Charles of Bavaria was crowned King of Bohemia, and on 12 February 1742, he became the first non-Habsburg Emperor since 1437. However, in a rare example of an Austrian winter offensive, by the end of February 1742, von Khevenhüller occupied much of Bavaria, including Munich, and most of Bohemia. 

The Austrians also employed guerilla warfare, using irregular troops or Pandurs to attack lines of communication. They inflicted considerable damage on Prussian troops and morale, one officer writing 'these thieves and robbers...never show themselves in battle, like proper brave soldiers.' In response,  Frederick moved into Moravia in March; he established himself at Židlochovice, which allowed him to threaten Vienna, and devastate the countryside.

By stripping garrisons from the rest of Bohemia, the Austrians assembled a field army of 28,000 to retake Prague, under Charles of Lorraine, who had a reputation as a cautious, timid and defensively minded general. Frederick took the offensive, and moved into North-East Bohemia; by 16 May, he had 10,000 infantry at Kutná Hora, with 18,000 men under Leopold of Anhalt-Dessau a day's march behind.

Charles was thought to be some distance away, but in the afternoon of 16 May, his cavalry ran into Leopold's rearguard. Recognising he was in contact with the Austrian main force, Leopold accelerated his march to close the gap with Frederick. At 2:00 am on 17 May, his exhausted troops stopped at the small village of Chotusice, three hours march from Kutná Hora.

Battle

Instructed to hold until Frederick reached him, Leopold deployed south of Chotusice, his infantry facing south-east, with cavalry on either flank. The left was commanded by Waldow, the right by the 70 year old veteran von Buddenbrock, Leopold leaving room for Frederick's infantry to deploy when they arrived. Charles of Lorraine hoped to attack before Frederick could reach him but was not ready to do so until 7:00 am; as he advanced north from Čáslav, his army drifted slightly to the right, allowing Buddenbrock's cavalry to outflank them.

Frederick arrived on the field at 8:00 am; to provide time to organise the infantry, he ordered the Prussian cavalry to charge, supported by field artillery. They drove the Austrian cavalry back, but the day was hot and dry, raising a huge cloud of dust and effectively blinding them. In the confusion, some units attacked in the wrong direction, allowing Karl Josef Batthyány and Liechtenstein to rally their men. Both sets of cavalry began looting each other's baggage trains, an act of collective indiscipline that rendered them useless for much of the battle.

The Austrian artillery had been bombarding Chotusice, around 9:00 am, Daun's infantry stormed the town, slowly driving Leopold's forces from house to house. As they did so, they set it on fire, the smoke adding to the confusion caused by the dust, and making exercising command almost impossible. By 10:30, Frederick's fresh infantry were deployed in a great square of 24 battalions; wheeling left, they fired into the Austrian infantry outside Chotusice. His flanks exposed by the cavalry's disappearance, Charles decided to settle for a draw. He ordered a general retreat through Čáslav, leaving some of his heavy guns behind; Liechtenstein's cavalry held off the Prussians, and by noon, combat had ceased.

Aftermath

The battle left the basic strategic situation unchanged; Charles was still able to move against Prague, while the Prussian presence in Moravia remained a threat to Vienna. Habsburg policy was generally to avoid fighting on too many fronts at the same time; although Prussia was the most dangerous, but also the most difficult to defeat. Although recovering Silesia remained a Habsburg priority for decades, Maria Theresa was willing to agree a temporary truce with Prussia to improve her position elsewhere.

This suited Frederick, who was short of money and men and also suspected France was preparing a separate peace. In June, the Treaty of Breslau ended the First Silesian War; Prussian troops withdrew from Bohemia, and Austria recaptured Prague in December.

Like other contemporaries, such as Maurice de Saxe, Frederick concluded morale was more effective in destroying enemy formations than firepower. At Mollwitz, the Austrians fled when faced with the steady, disciplined advance of the Prussian infantry; at Chotusice, it convinced Charles of Lorraine to settle for a draw. When the Second Silesian War began in 1744, Frederick told his officers the infantry had to do only two things; form up quickly, then maintain their formation.

The battle also showed the Prussian cavalry still needed work, particularly in horsemanship; a contributory factor to their apparent indiscipline was the inability of many to control their mounts and this became an area of focus after 1743. Von Gessler, who led Buddenbrock's charge, was promoted lieutenant general, and received the Order of the Black Eagle; at Hohenfriedberg in 1745, he commanded the cavalry charge claimed as a key factor in Prussian victory.

Notes

References

Sources

Conflicts in 1742
Battles of the War of the Austrian Succession
Battles involving Austria
Battles involving Prussia
1742 in Austria
1742 in the Habsburg monarchy
18th century in Bohemia
Battles of Frederick the Great
Battles of the Silesian Wars
Battles in Bohemia
History of the Central Bohemian Region